Albionella is a genus of jumping spiders found in Panama.

, the World Spider Catalog recognizes only one species in the genus, Albionella propria. Two other species have previously been recognized: Albionella guianensis, regarded as a dubious name, and Albionella chickeringi, now placed in the genus Mago as Mago checkeringi.

References

Salticidae
Spiders of Central America
Monotypic Salticidae genera